A cape (headland) is a point of land extending into the sea. Turkey, being a country of two big peninsulas (Anatolia and Thrace) is surrounded by four seas and has many capes. The surrounding seas (counter-clockwise from the north) are the Black Sea, the Sea of Marmara, the Aegean Sea,  and the  Mediterranean Sea.

The list 
The following list gives the names of capes of Turkey. The names are sometimes used with the suffix   burun   which means cape.

See also
Bays of Turkey
Peninsulas of Turkey
Geography of Turkey

References

Lists of landforms of Turkey